Guest is a 2019 Burmese drama film starring Shwe Htoo, Shwe Hmone Yati and Nay Chi Oo. The film, produced by 7th Sense Film Production and premiered in Myanmar on May 30, 2019.

Cast
Shwe Htoo as Nay La
Shwe Hmone Yati as Myu Moe
Nay Chi Oo as Hnin Nu
Phyo Ngwe Soe as  U Myat Min Naing

References

2019 films
2010s Burmese-language films
Burmese drama films
Films shot in Myanmar